The 1994 Cincinnati Bengals season was the team's 27th year in professional football and its 25th with the National Football League.

On October 2 history was made at Riverfront Stadium, when Dave Shula and the Bengals faced father Don Shula's Miami Dolphins in the first father-son coaching match up in NFL history. The elder Shula would emerge victorious 23–7, as the Bengals were in the midst of a 0–8 start for the third time in four years.

The Bengals equaled their 3-13 record from 1993 and again missed out on a playoff berth. During the season, the Bengals decided to move on from the struggling David Klingler, who had not lived up to his potential as the team's quarterback of the future despite being a high draft pick. After seven weeks without a win, Klingler was pulled in favor of off-season acquisition Jeff Blake, who nearly upset the defending world champion Dallas Cowboys in his first start.

Offseason

NFL Draft

Undrafted free agents

Personnel

Staff

Roster

Regular season 
October 2, 1994: Dubbed the “Shula Bowl”, it marked the first time in NFL history that a head coaching matchup featured father against son. Don Shula’s Miami Dolphins defeated David Shula’s Cincinnati Bengals by a 23-7 mark.

Schedule

Standings

Season summary

Week 13 at Broncos

Team leaders

Passing

Rushing

Receiving

Defensive

Kicking and punting

Special teams

Awards and records 
 Doug Pelfrey, Franchise Record, Most Field Goals in One Game, 6 (achieved on November 6, 1994) 
 Jeff Blake, AFC offensive player of the month for November
 Darnay Scott, WR, PFWA All-Rookie Team

Milestones 
 Carl Pickens, 1st 1000 Yard Receiving Season (1,127 yards)

References

External links 
 1994 Cincinnati Bengals at Pro-Football-Reference.com

Cincinnati Bengals
Cincinnati Bengals seasons
Cincin